Berlu is a Vietnamese restaurant and bakery in Portland, Oregon.

Description 
Berlu is a Vietnamese restaurant in southeast Portland's Buckman neighborhood.

History 
The restaurant opened in June 2019. Jorge Rico has served as sous chef.

Reception 
The restaurant earned chef Vincent Nguyen a James Beard Foundation Award nomination in the category Best Chef: Northwest and Pacific. Waz Wu included Berlu in Eater Portland's 2023 list of "Portland’s Primo Special Occasion Restaurants for Vegans and Vegetarians".

See also 

 List of bakeries
 List of Vietnamese restaurants

References

External links

 

2019 establishments in Oregon
Bakeries of Oregon
Buckman, Portland, Oregon
Restaurants established in 2019
Vietnamese restaurants in Portland, Oregon